A narrow-body aircraft or single-aisle aircraft is an airliner arranged along a single aisle, permitting up to 6-abreast seating in a cabin less than  in width.

Market

Historically, beginning in the late 1960s and continuing through the 1990s, twin engine narrow-body aircraft, such as the Boeing 737 Classic, McDonnell-Douglas MD-80 and Airbus A320 were primarily employed in short to medium-haul markets requiring neither the range nor the passenger-carrying capacity of that period's wide-body aircraft.

The re-engined B737 MAX and A320neo jets offer 500 miles more range, allowing them to operate the 3,000 miles transatlantic flights between the eastern U.S. and Western Europe, previously dominated by wide-body aircraft.
Norwegian Air Shuttle, JetBlue Airways and TAP Portugal will open up direct routes bypassing airline hubs for lower fares between cheaper, smaller airports.
The B737NG 3,300-mile range is insufficient for fully laden operations and operates at reduced capacity like the A318, while the Airbus A321LR could replace the less fuel efficient B757s used since their production ended in 2004.

Boeing will face competition and pricing pressure from the Embraer E-Jet E2 family, Airbus A220 (formerly Bombardier CSeries) and Comac C919.

Between 2016 and 2035, Flightglobal expects 26,860 single-aisles to be delivered for almost $ billion, 45% Airbus A320 family ceo and neo and 43% Boeing 737 NG and max.
By June 2018, there was 10,572 Airbus A320neo and Boeing 737 MAX orders: 6,068 Airbuses (%, 2,295 with CFMs, 1,623 with PWs and 2,150 with not yet decided engines) and 4,504 Boeings (%); 3,446 in Asia-Pacific (%), 2,349 in Europe (%), 1,926 in North America (%), 912 in Latin America (%), 654 in Middle East (%), 72 in Africa (%) and 1,213 not yet bounded (%).

Many airlines have shown interest in the A321LR or its A321XLR derivative, and other extended-range models, for thin transatlantic and Asia-Pacific routes.

Examples

Six-abreast cabin

Five-abreast cabin

Four-abreast cabin

Three-abreast cabin

Two-abreast cabin

Image gallery

See also 
 List of regional airliners
 Regional jet
 Wide-body aircraft

Notes

References

Aircraft configurations
Airliners